The 28th Annual Australian Recording Industry Association Music Awards (generally known as ARIA Music Awards or simply The ARIAs) are a series of award ceremonies which include the 2014 ARIA Artisan Awards, ARIA Hall of Fame Awards, ARIA Fine Arts Awards and ARIA Awards. The latter ceremony took place on 26 November at the Star Event Centre, and was telecast by Network Ten.

The final nominees for ARIA Awards categories were announced on 10 October, as well as nominees and winners for Fine Arts Awards and Artisan Awards. Public votes were used for the categories, Song of the Year, Best Australian Live Act, Best International Artist and Best Video.

Also on 26 November, ARIA inducted Molly Meldrum and his TV series, Countdown, into their Hall of Fame. Denis Handlin, CEO of Sony Music Entertainment Australia and New Zealand, and ARIA Chairman, was presented with the second ARIA Industry Icon Award. In October 2021 the Board of ARIA withdrew Handlin's award. Handlin had left Sony in June 2021 amid "multiple allegations of toxic culture" at the company while he was CEO.

Performers

The following artists performed at the ARIA Music Awards.

5 Seconds of Summer (Opening)
One Direction
Chet Faker
Hilltop Hoods
Justice Crew
Sheppard

Presenters

Katy Perry presented Best Female Artist
The Veronicas presented Best International Artist
Illy and Charli XCX presented Breakthrough Artist
Havana Brown and Nathaniel presented Best Dance Release
Matt Okine and Alex Dyson presented Best Independent Release
Samantha Jade presented Best Video
Russell Morris presented Best Australian Live Act
Justine Clarke presented Best Children's Album
Kasey Chambers presented Best Blues & Roots Album
Scott Tweedie and Delta Goodrem presented Song Of The Year
Ella Hooper presented Best Rock Album
Troy Cassar-Daley presented Best Country Album 
Ash London presented Best Urban Album
Dom Alessio presented Best Hard Rock/Heavy Metal Album
John Butler Trio presented Best Adult Contemporary Album
Tom Ballard presented Best Group and Best Comedy Release
Jessica Mauboy presented Best Male Artist 
Jon & Tim Farriss (INXS) presented Album Of The Year
Marcia Hines and John Paul Young inducts Ian Molly Meldrum into the ARIA Hall Of Fame

ARIA Hall of Fame Inductees

In late October 2014 ARIA announced their Hall of Fame inductees:
 Molly Meldrum
 Countdown

Nominees and winners

ARIA Awards
Winners are listed first and highlighted in boldface; other final nominees are listed alphabetically by artists' first name.

Fine Arts Awards
Winners are listed first and highlighted in boldface; other final nominees are listed alphabetically by artists' first name.

Artisan Awards
Winners are listed first and highlighted in boldface; other final nominees are listed alphabetically by artists' first name.

See also
Music of Australia

Notes

References

External links

2014 in Australian music
2014 music awards
ARIA Music Awards